Meenakshi Sundararajan Engineering College (MSEC) (Tamil:மீனாட்சி சுந்தரராஜன் பொறியியல் கல்லூரி) is an engineering college in Kodambakkam, Chennai, Tamil Nadu, India and it is founded in 2001.

History 
The Engineering College was founded in 2001 by the educationist of South India, Professor K.R.Sundararajan. Meenakshi Sundararajan Engineering College is a part of the KRS Group of Institutions which includes the Indian Institute of Technical Education (IIET, est. 1947), Meenakshi College for Women and the Meenakshi Sundararajan School of Management. Institutions dedicated to impart qualitative education and research for both under-graduate and post-graduate education in the fields of Engineering, Arts, Science, Commerce and Management.

Courses 
 B.E. Electrical and Electronics Engineering
 B.Tech Information Technology
 B.E. Mechanical Engineering
 B.E. Civil Engineering
 B.E. Computer Science and Engineering
 B.E. Electronics and Communication Engineering
 M.E. Construction Engineering and Management

References

External links 
 Official website

Engineering colleges in Chennai
Educational institutions established in 2001
2001 establishments in Tamil Nadu